Hull Bridge is a village in the East Riding of Yorkshire, England. It lies south of the A1035 road and straddles the Beverley and Barmston Drain and the River Hull from which it takes its name.

It forms part of the civil parish of Tickton.

Bridge

The bridge over the river was the cause of a long-running disagreement between the commissioners of the Driffield Navigation and Beverley Corporation. The small opening in the stone structure restricted boats wanting to proceed up-river to the Driffield Navigation, and the commissioners attempted to obtain powers to replace it in 1777, but were thwarted by Beverley Corporation, who thought that a swing bridge would make access from the town to Holderness more difficult. In November 1799, the commissioners met to consider ways "for avoiding the very great losses, injuries and inconveniences sustained by this Navigation, from the stoppage of the Vessels (using the said Navigation) at Hull Bridge." Despite Beverley saying that they would never alter the bridge, an agreement was eventually reached in 1801, and an Act of Parliament was obtained in July, to authorise the work. Half of the cost of £500 was paid by Richard Bethell, the owner of the Leven Canal, on the understanding that tolls for passing under the bridge would be reduced, and the new crossing was completed by April 1804.

In 1913, the new bridge was demolished by the County Council, who installed a steel rolling bridge in its place. Once the Tickton Bypass bridge had been built a short distance upstream, it no longer needed to carry road traffic, and it was replaced by a footbridge in 1976.

References

Bibliography

External links

Villages in the East Riding of Yorkshire